Yevgeny Georgiyevich Yozhikov-Babakhanov (born 12 May 1942) is a Soviet and Kazakh politician who served as a member of the Supreme Soviet of the Kazakh SSR from 1980 to 1989, member of the Congress of People's Deputies of the Soviet Union from 1989 to 1991, First Deputy Prime Minister of Kazakhstan from June 1991 to February 1992 and Deputy Prime Minister of Kazakhstan from February 1992 to January 1993.

Biography

Early life and education 
Yozhikov-Babakhanov was born in Saratov in present-day Russia. In 1965, he graduated from the Lviv Polytechnic Institute with a degree in electrical engineering, later in 1978, from the All-Union Civil Engineering Institute of Distance Learning with a degree in engineer-economist and Russian Presidential Academy of National Economy and Public Administration in 1981.

Career 
In 1965, Yozhikov-Babakhanov became a member of the Communist Party of the Soviet Union (CPSU). From 1969, he worked in the party and Soviet bodies of the Kazakh SSR. In 1980, Yozhikov-Babakhanov was elected as a member of the Supreme Soviet of the Kazakh SSR of the 10th convocation. In 1985, he became a Minister of Installation and Special Construction Works of the Kazakh SSR and from 1988, Yozhikov-Babakhanov served as a First Secretary of the Dzhezkazgan Regional Committee of the CPSU. He was elected in the 1989 Soviet Union legislative election as a member of the Congress of People's Deputies of the Soviet Union until being appointed as the State Counselor of Kazakh SSR on Construction, Science and Regional Development on 24 December 1990, then as First Deputy Prime Minister of Kazakh SSR on 25 June 1991.

From December 16, 1991 First Deputy Prime Minister of Kazakhstan.

On 6 February 1992, Yozhikov-Babakhanov relieved from his post as the First Deputy and became the Deputy Prime Minister of Kazakhstan. He served that position until he was appointed as the chairman of the Main Control Inspectorate under the President of the Republic of Kazakhstan on 18 January 1993 until being relieved from his post on 24 November 1993.

 Yozhikov-Babakhanov resides in Almaty and is serving as the chairman of the board of directors and President of CJSC Montazhspetsstroy.

References 

1942 births
Living people
Politicians from Saratov
Communist Party of the Soviet Union members
Lviv Polytechnic alumni
Members of the Congress of People's Deputies of the Soviet Union
People's commissars and ministers of the Kazakh Soviet Socialist Republic
Recipients of the Order of Kurmet
Recipients of the Order of the Red Banner of Labour
Kazakhstani people of Armenian descent
Soviet colonels
Soviet politicians
First Deputy Prime Ministers of Kazakhstan